Ahmadabad (also Romanized as Aḩmadābād; also known as Aḩmadābād-e Qeyţās and Aḩmadābād-e Qeytās) is a village in Abezhdan Rural District, Abezhdan District, Andika County, Khuzestan Province, Iran. At the 2006 census, its population was 612, in 124 families.

References 

Populated places in Andika County